Cyrus Carpenter Yawkey (August 29, 1862 – May 18, 1943), commonly known as C. C. Yawkey, was an American business executive in lumber, and politician in Wisconsin.

Biography
Born in Chicago, Illinois, Yawkey moved with his family to Saginaw, Michigan, where he was educated. He started out as a clerk and then owned a business. He then moved to Wisconsin and started a sawmill in present-day Hazelhurst. He served on the Hazelhurst town board and the Oneida County board of supervisors. In 1895–1896, he served in the Wisconsin State Assembly as a Republican. In 1899, he moved to Wausau, Wisconsin, where he had his lumber business. During World War I, he was a colonel in the Wisconsin National Guard. Yawkey died in May 1943 in Wausau, Wisconsin.

A cousin, William H. Yawkey, owned the Detroit Tigers baseball team.

References

External links

Businesspeople from Chicago
Politicians from Saginaw, Michigan
People from Oneida County, Wisconsin
Politicians from Wausau, Wisconsin
Businesspeople from Michigan
Businesspeople from Wisconsin
County supervisors in Wisconsin
Republican Party members of the Wisconsin State Assembly
1862 births
1943 deaths
Politicians from Chicago
Wisconsin National Guard personnel